meta-Chloroperoxybenzoic acid (mCPBA or mCPBA) is a peroxycarboxylic acid. It is a white solid often used widely as an oxidant in organic synthesis. mCPBA is often preferred to other peroxy acids because of its relative ease of handling.  mCPBA is a strong oxidizing agent that may cause fire upon contact with flammable material.

Preparation and purification
mCPBA can be prepared by reacting m-Chlorobenzoyl chloride with a basic solution of hydrogen peroxide, followed by acidification.

It is sold commercially as a shelf-stable mixture that is less than 72% mCPBA, with the balance made up of m-chlorobenzoic acid (10%) and water. The peroxyacid can be purified by washing the commercial material with a  sodium hydroxide and potassium phosphate solution buffered at pH = 7.5. Peroxyacids are generally slightly less acidic than their carboxylic acid counterparts, so one can extract the acid impurity by careful control of pH. The purified material is reasonably stable against decomposition if stored at low temperatures in a plastic container.

In reactions where the exact amount of mCPBA must be controlled, a sample can be titrated to determine the exact amount of active oxidant.

Reactions
The main areas of use are the conversion of ketones to esters (Baeyer-Villiger oxidation), epoxidation of alkenes (Prilezhaev reaction), conversion of silyl enol ethers to silyl α-hydroxy ketones (Rubottom oxidation), oxidation of sulfides to sulfoxides and sulfones, and oxidation of amines to produce amine oxides. The following scheme shows the epoxidation of cyclohexene with mCPBA.

The epoxidation mechanism is concerted: the cis or trans geometry of the alkene starting material is retained in the epoxide ring of the product.  The transition state of the Prilezhaev reaction is given below:

The geometry of the transition state, with the peracid bisecting the C-C double bond, allows the two primary frontier orbital interactions to occur: πC=C (HOMO) to σ*O-O (LUMO) and nO (HOMO, regarded as a filled p orbital on a sp2 hybridized oxygen) to π*C=C (LUMO), corresponding, in arrow-pushing terms, to formation of one C-O bond and cleavage of the O-O bond and formation of the other C-O bond and cleavage of the C=C π bond.

References

Chlorobenzenes
Oxidizing agents
Organic peroxy acids
Reagents for organic chemistry